Mud dauber (or "mud wasp" or "dirt dauber") is a name commonly applied to a number of wasps from either the family Sphecidae or Crabronidae which build their nests from mud; this excludes members of the family Vespidae (especially the subfamily Eumeninae), which are instead referred to as "potter wasps". Mud daubers belong to different families and are variable in appearance. The name refers to the nests that are made by the female wasps, which consist of mud molded into place by the wasp's mandibles. Mud daubers are not normally aggressive, but can become belligerent when threatened. Stings are uncommon.

Nests

The organ pipe mud dauber, one of many mud daubers in the family Crabronidae, builds nests in the shape of a cylindrical tube resembling an organ pipe or pan flute. Common sites include vertical or horizontal faces of walls, cliffs, bridges, overhangs and shelter caves or other structures.

The nest of a black and yellow mud dauber species Sceliphron caementarium is a simple, one, two or sometimes three celled, cigar-shaped mass that is attached to crevices, cracks and corners. Each cell contains one egg. Usually several cells are clumped together and covered in mud. The blue mud dauber species Chalybion californicum, another sphecid, builds mud nests, but occasionally refurbishes the abandoned nests of other species; it preys primarily on spiders. The two species commonly occupy the same barns, porches, or other nest sites.

All mud daubers may occupy the same sites year after year, creating large numbers of nests in protected locations; such sites are often used as nest sites by other kinds of wasps and bees, as well as other types of insects.

One disadvantage to making nests is that most, if not all, of the nest-maker’s offspring are concentrated in one place, making them highly vulnerable to predation. Once a predator finds a nest, it can plunder it cell by cell. A variety of parasitic wasps, ranging from extremely tiny chalcidoid wasps to larger, bright green chrysidid wasps attack mud dauber nests. They pirate provisions and offspring as food for their own offspring.

Food
Like most other solitary wasps, mud daubers are parasitoids, but unlike the majority of parasitoids, they actively capture and paralyze the prey upon which they lay their eggs. The females build the nests, and hunt to provision them. Males of pipe-organ mud daubers have been observed bringing spiders to the nest, and nest guarding, an extremely rare appearance of male parental care, otherwise virtually unknown among Hymenoptera.

Black and yellow mud daubers primarily prey on relatively small, colorful spiders, such as crab spiders (and related groups), orb weavers and some jumping spiders. They usually find them in and around vegetation. Blue mud daubers are the main predator of the black and brown widow spiders.

Adults of both sexes frequently drink flower nectar, but they stock their nests with spiders, which serve as food for their offspring. Mud daubers prefer particular kinds and sizes of spiders for their larders. Instead of stocking a nest cell with one or two large spiders, mud daubers cram as many as two dozen small spiders into a nest cell.

To capture a spider, the wasp grabs it and stings it. The venom from the sting does not kill the spider, but paralyzes and preserves it so it can be transported and stored in the nest cell until consumed by the larva. A mud dauber usually lays its egg on the prey item and then seals it into the nest cell with a mud cap. It then builds another cell or nest. The young survive the winter inside the nest.

Airplane incidents

Birgenair Flight 301
On February 6, 1996, Birgenair Flight 301, a 757 jet flying from Puerto Plata in the Dominican Republic, crashed into the Atlantic Ocean. All 13 crew members and 176 passengers were killed. A key part of the accident was a blocked pitot tube. Although the tubes were never recovered from the ocean floor, the plane had been sitting on the tarmac for twenty-five days with uncovered pitot tubes. Investigators believe a black and yellow mud dauber, Sceliphron caementarium, got into the tube and built its cylindrical nest inside, causing faulty air-speed readings that were a large part of the crash. The main and primary cause of the crash, however, was pilot error due to the flight crew's improper response to inaccurate air-speed and the stick-shaker stall warning.

Gulfstream N450KK
On April 10, 2015, about 18:45 Eastern Daylight Time, a Gulfstream Aerospace G-IV, N450KK, was substantially damaged during a cabin over-pressurization event over the Caribbean Sea while en route to Fort Lauderdale, Florida, United States. An initial examination of the fuselage revealed that the outflow valve safety port, located on the outer fuselage, was completely plugged with a foreign material resembling dried soil from a mud dauber.

See also
 Online guide to Eastern North American Sphecidae Includes information on all the mud daubers and their look alikes
 Texas Cooperative Extension. Mud Daubers
 Genus Chalybion (blue mud daubers)
 Genus Sceliphron (black mud daubers)
 Organ pipe mud dauber
 Potter wasp
 Tropical Hover Wasp

References

External links

 A pictorial life cycle of organ pipe wasps

Apoidea
Insect common names